Damián Óscar Timpani (born August 8, 1969) is an Argentine retired footballer.

He played for several lower league clubs in Argentina before moving to Spain where he played for Xerez, Elche, Real Murcia, Ciudad de Murcia and Orihuela.

External links
 Damián Timpani at BDFA.com.ar 

1969 births
Living people
Footballers from Buenos Aires
Argentine footballers
All Boys footballers
Nueva Chicago footballers
Club Almagro players
Xerez CD footballers
Elche CF players
Real Murcia players
Ciudad de Murcia footballers
Orihuela CF players
Argentine expatriate sportspeople in Spain

Association football defenders